al-Bassa' was a Palestinian Arab village in the Mandatory Palestine's Acre Subdistrict.

The village was stormed by Haganah troops in May 1948 and almost completely razed. Its residents were either internally displaced or expelled to neighboring countries. Today, the ruins of the village are in the northern quarters of the moshav of Shlomi.

Etymology
Adolf Neubauer "proposed  to identify this place  with the Batzet of the Talmud". It was called Bezeth during the Roman period, and its Arabic name is al-Basah. In the period of Crusader rule in Palestine, it was known as Le Bace or LeBassa. Imad ad-Din al-Isfahani (d. 1201), a chronicler and advisor to Saladin, referred to the village as Ayn al-Bassa.

History
The site shows signs of habitation in prehistory and the Middle Bronze Age. It was a Jewish settlement between 70 and 425 CE. Blown glass pitchers uncovered in a tomb in al-Bassa were dated to circa 396 CE. An ancient Christian burial place and 18 other archaeological sites were located in the village.

Middle Ages 
 
The Survey of Western Palestine, sponsored by the Palestine Exploration Fund, identified al-Bassa as, "probably a Crusading village"; however, archaeological excavations uncovered evidence of an ecclesiastical farm in operation there between the 5th to 8th centuries, and pottery sherds indicate continuous inhabitation throughout the Middle Ages.

The site was used in 1189 C.E. as a Crusader encampment during a military campaign, and a document dated October 1200 recorded the sale of the village by King Amalric II of Jerusalem to the Teutonic Order.  No Crusader era buildings have been found in al-Bassa, and a cross once dated to the Crusader period was later re-dated to the Byzantine era. A-Bassa was the first village listed as part of the domain of the Crusaders during the hudna between the Crusaders based in Acre and the Mamluk sultan al-Mansur (Qalawun) in 1283.

Ottoman Empire 
In 1596, al-Bassa was part of the Ottoman Empire, a village in the nahiya (subdistrict) of Tibnin under the Safad Sanjak, with a population of 76 Muslim families and 28 Muslim bachelors. It paid taxes on a number of crops, including wheat olives, barley, cotton and fruits, as well as on goats, beehives and pasture land; a total of 7,000 Akçe.

In the 18th century, al-Bassa became a zone of contention between Zahir al-Umar and the chiefs of Jabal Amil under Sheikh Nasif al-Nassar, while under his successor, Jezzar Pasha, al-Bassa was made the administrative center of the nahiya in around 1770. In 1799, Napoleon Bonaparte described al-Bassa as a village of 600 Metawalis. A map by Pierre Jacotin  from Napoleon's invasion of that year showed the place, named as El Basa.

The European explorer Van de Velde visited "el-Bussa" in 1851, and stayed with the sheikh, Aisel Yusuf, writing that "The clean house of Sheck Yusuf is a welcome sight, and the verdant meadows around the village are truly refreshing to the eye". He further noted that "The inhabitants of Bussah are almost all members of the Greek Church. A few Musselmans live among them, and a few fellahs of a Bedouin tribe which wanders about in the neighborhood are frequently seen in the street."

In 1863, the village was visited by Henry Baker Tristram who described it as a Christian village, where "olive oil, goats´hair, and tobacco, seemed to be principal produce of the district; the latter being exported in some quantities, by way of Acre, to Egypt. Bee-keeping, also, is not an unimportant item of industry, and every house possesses a pile of bee-hives in its yard."

In the late 19th century, the village of Al-Bassa was described as being built of stone, situated on the edge of a plain, surrounded by large groves of olives and gardens of pomegranate, figs and apples. The village had about 1,050 residents.

The village had a public elementary school for boys (built by the Ottomans in 1882), a private secondary school, and a public elementary school for girls.

A population list from about 1887 showed that el Basseh had 1,960 inhabitants; one third Muslim, and two thirds Greek Catholic Christians.

British Mandate 
The Franco-British boundary agreement of 1920 described an imprecisely defined boundary between Lebanon and Palestine. It appeared to pass close to the north of al-Bassa, leaving the village on the Palestinian side but cut off from much of its lands. However the French government included al-Bassa in a Lebanese census of 1921 and granted citizenship to its residents. Meanwhile, a joint British-French boundary commission was working to determine a precise border, making many adjustments in the process. By February 1922 it had determined a border that confirmed al-Bassa as being in Palestine. This became official in 1923. The citizenship of the residents was changed to Palestinian in 1926.

In 1922, the people of al-Bassa founded a local council which was responsible for managing its local affairs. The British census of September 1922  listed a population of 867 Christians, 150 Metawalis and 1 Jew, though Kaufman reports that the Muslims were Sunni rather than Metawali. The Christians were listed as Greek Catholic (Melchite) (721), Orthodox (120), Church of England (17), Armenian Catholic (8), and one Roman Catholic. Its main economic activity was olive picking. At the  1931 census, which did not distinguish Metawalis from other Muslims, the village had 868 Muslims, 1076 Christians, and 4 Bahais.

The 1938 camp of Jewish labourers and Notrim (police) for construction of Tegart's wall was located adjacent to the village, and it ultimately became the site of a Tegart fort. By 1945 the village  was home to a regional college.

Important public structures at the time of its existence included two mosques, two churches, three schools and 18 other shrines both holy to Muslims and Christians. Al-Bassa was the only Palestinian village in the Galilee with a Christian high school. Some of Bassa's former public structures have been preserved and are found today within the Israeli localities of Shlomi and Betzet.

1938 massacre
In 1938, during the 1936–1939 Arab revolt in Palestine, the village was the scene of a massacre committed by British soldiers. On September 6, 1938, four soldiers of the Royal Ulster Rifles (RUR) were killed when their armoured car ran over a land mine near the village. In retaliation, British forces burnt the village down. After that, perhaps a few days later, about 50 Arabs from the village were collected by the RUR and some attached Royal Engineers. Some who tried to run away were shot.  Then, according to British testimony, the remainder were put onto a bus which was forced to drive over a land mine laid by the soldiers, destroying the bus and killing many of the occupants. The village's inhabitants were then forced to dig a pit and throw all the remnants of the maimed bodies into it. Arab accounts added torture and other brutality. The total death toll was about 20.

In 2022, a Nablus businessman, Munib al-Masri (88) who was shot by British troops in 1944, after an independent review of documentation by two international legal scholars, Luis Moreno Ocampo and  Ben Emmerson, stated that he would present the British government with a 300 page dossier on this and other incidents,  seeking accountability and a formal apology for abuses during the period of the British mandate.

1940s

Al-Bassa was one of the largest, most developed villages in the north of the country, covering a land area of some 20,000 dunams of hills and plains, 2,000 of which were irrigated. A regional commercial center, it contained over sixty shops and eleven coffeehouses, a few of which sat along the Haifa-Beirut highway. The active village council had paved roads, installed a system of running water, and oversaw the convening of a wholesale produce market there every Sunday. An agricultural cooperative in the village counted over 150 members that promoted agricultural development, while also providing loans to local farmers. The population of about 4,000 was divided almost evenly between Muslims and Christians. Among the village institutions were a government run elementary school, a "National High School", a Greek Orthodox church, a Catholic church, and a mosque. The village was situated in the territory allotted to the Arab state under the 1947 UN Partition Plan. 

Of this, Arabs used 614 dunams for citrus and bananas, 14,699  dunams were plantations and irrigable land; 10,437 were  used for cereals, while 132 dunams were built-up (urban) land.

Israel

Al-Bassa was captured by Yishuv's Haganah forces during the 1948 Arab–Israeli War, in Operation Ben-Ami, on May 14, 1948. Al-Bassa's defenders were local militia men. Following its capture, the Haganah's Palmach forces concentrated the villagers in the local church where they shot and killed a number of youths before chasing the villagers out. One witness to the expulsion said that it was preceded by soldiers shooting and killing five villagers inside the church, while another said seven villagers were shot and killed by soldiers outside the church.

Al-Bassa was completely destroyed by the Israelis with the exception of a few houses, a church, and a Muslim shrine. At least 60 of the Christian villagers of Al-Bassa were taken by the Haganah to Mazra'a, where they remained for more than a year. Altogether 81 residents of al-Bassa became Israeli citizens as internally displaced Palestinians who lost their land rights and ended up in places like Nazareth. The only day on which Palestinians did not require a permit to travel during that period was Israel's Independence Day. On this day, which Palestinians call Nakba Day, internally displaced Palestinians would visit their former villages. Wakim Wakim, an attorney from Al-Bassa and a leading member of the Association for the Defense of the Rights of the Internally Displaced explains: "The day when Israel celebrates is the day we mourn" (emphasis in original).

Most of the former villagers of al-Bassa (circa 95%) were pushed north towards Lebanon, concentrating in the Dbayeh refugee camp near Jounieh east of Beirut. Prior to and during the Lebanese Civil War, this camp suffered severe damage in the fighting and was largely destroyed, though it still has a population of some 4,233 people who are mostly Palestinian Christian refugees. Other former residents of Al-Bassa and the refugee camp in Lebanon ended up in Lansing, Michigan where they established an international village club and hold annual gatherings attended by over 300 people.

The village was inspected in 1992, when it was found that although most of the houses of Al-Bassa had been destroyed, a number of historic buildings survived, including  two churches, a mosque, and a maqam.

Landmarks
According to Petersen, the mosque  appears to be a relatively modern construct, probably built in the early 1900s. It consists of a tall square room with a flat roof supported by iron girders. There is a cylindrical minaret at the north-east corner. There are tall pointed  windows on all four sides, and a mihrab in the middle of the south wall. At the time of the inspection, 1992, the building was used as a sheep pen.

The maqam is located about 20 meters east of the mosque. It consists of two parts: a walled courtyard, and a domed prayer room. In the courtyard there is a mihrab in the south wall, and a doorway in the east wall leads into the main prayer room. Pendentives springing from four thick piers support wide arches and the dome. In the middle of the south wall there is a mihrab, next to a simple minbar, made of four stone steps.

The site of Khirbet Masub was immediately to the east of Bassa, in which was found the Phoenician Masub inscription.

Culture
Henry Baker Tristram during his 1863 visit to the village made a detailed description of the women's Palestinian costumes.

Weir, after quoting what Tristram wrote about the head-dresses in Al-Bussah, notes that coin headdresses went out of use for daily wear in Galilee at the beginning of the 20th century, but continued to be worn by brides for their weddings.

See also
Depopulated Palestinian locations in Israel

References

Bibliography

 (p.  333)  
Cohen, A. (1973), Palestine in the Eighteenth Century: Patterns of Government and Administration. Hebrew University, Jerusalem. Cited in Khalidi, (1992)
 ( p.156 )

External links and references
Welcome to al-Bassa
al-Bassa,  Zochrot
Survey of Western Palestine, Map 3:  IAA, Wikimedia commons 
Al-Bassa at Khalil Sakakini Cultural Center
 Al-Bassah Dr. Moslih Kanaaneh
  Al-Bassa International Association - an "international forum" for former residents of al-Bassa.

Former populated places in Israel
Arab villages depopulated during the 1948 Arab–Israeli War
District of Acre
Massacres committed by the United Kingdom